TOPAZ is a think-tank of the Czech political party TOP 09, which is its founder. It was established in April 2012 as a civic group, today it operates as an association.

Mission of TOPAZ is to transmit conservative ideas to wider partisan and non partisan public and to continue in educational activities that were coordinated by TOP 09 Internal Commission for Education in last years. Content of association's activity is discussion about society-wide topics along with independent experts, cooperation with expert committees of TOP 09, fundraising, creation of body alternatives to public administration outcomes and creation of analytical and conceptual materials that deal with individual issues and suggest possibilities of solving.

Establishment of TOPAZ as an educational platform of political party was inspired by similar projects abroad, for instance Political Academy of the Austrian People's Party or Konrad Adenauer Foundation with a bond to the Christian Democratic Union of Germany.

Association Leadership 
List of TOPAZ leading organs and its members:

Association Director 
 Karel Schwarzenberg

Executive Council 
 Reda Ifrah – Executive Council Chairman
 Helena Langšádlová
 Jan Husák
 Jan Vitula
 Marek Ženíšek

Academic Council 
 Miroslav Zámečník
 Zdeněk Tůma
 Hynek Jeřábek

Educational Events and Discussions 
TOPAZ organizes conferences and seminars focusing on education of TOP 09 members and non partisan public.

Task of this activity is to bring significant personalities and experts to discussion, local civic initiatives  and regular civilians including youth. Point of this discussion is to familiarize public with contributions of democracy and membership in the European Union and to present conservative policy values in general. The main point is to search and create new opinions that can be used by TOP 09 in real politics.

Publication Activity 
Outcomes from educational events of TOPAZ create collections that contain contributions of conference and seminar guests.

List of collections (date of publication in brackets):
 Electromobility: future development of power engineering and transportation (5. 11. 2015)
 Social living (28. 5. 2015)
 Economy development of Visegrad group (16. 3. 2015)
 Power engineering: threats and chances (10. 11. 2014)
 Smart Cities Memorandum (9. 9. 2014)
 Opinions about Europe (7. 5. 2014)
 Do not be afraid of reforms (20. 9. 2012)
 Election manual of TOP 09 and Mayors (23. 8. 2012)

Internship Project 
Through TOPAZ university students have a chance to participate in an internship in statewide office, parliamentary club and regional offices of TOP 09. This project works under association since 2014. TOPAZ cooperates in this project along with Faculty of Social Studies at Masaryk University and Philosophical Faculty of Palacký University, Olomouc, (through programme YoungPower). Trainees come also from Faculty of Social Science at Charles University in Prague or Metropolitan University Prague.

Partners 
Partners of TOPAZ are:
 Wilfried Martens Centre for European Studies
 Konrad Adenauer Foundation
 TOP 09

See also 
 TOP 09
 Konrad Adenauer Foundation
 Wilfried Martens Centre for European Studies
 Political Academy of the Austrian People's Party

References

External links
 TOPAZ Home Page 
 TOPAZ: Public Register Statement 
 Documents of TOPAZ (Statutes) 
 TOP 09 
 YoungPower - UPOL 

TOP 09
Think tanks based in the Czech Republic
2012 establishments in the Czech Republic